Boys Will Be Boys is the fifth studio album by English singer Gary Glitter, released on 10 March 1984 by Arista Records. It features two top 30 hits: "Dance Me Up" and "Another Rock and Roll Christmas". It was the first album released by Glitter since Silver Star just under seven years earlier. It is the only studio album of Glitter's never released on CD.

Critical reception

In a retrospective review for AllMusic, critic Dave Thompson described the album as "a magnificent comeback and a powerful reminder that, even in his showbiz dotage, Gary Glitter remained one of Britain's greatest-ever entertainers."

Track listing
All songs are written by Mike Leander, Eddie (Edward John) Seago and Gary Glitter, except where noted.
Side one
"Close to You" – 4:04
"Crash Crash" – 3:23
"Let's Get Sexy" – 3:37
"Dance Me Up" – 3:31
"When I'm On" (Glitter, Leander) – 4:32
Side two
"Another Rock and Roll Christmas" – 3:47
"Shout, Shout, Shout" – 8:54
"If You Want Me" – 4:34
"Hair of the Dog" – 3:12
"Boys Will Be Boys" – 3:44

Personnel
Credits are adapted from the Boys Will Be Boys liner notes.

 Gary Glitter – lead and backing vocals
 Martin Jenkins – additional backing vocals

Production and artwork
 Mike Leander – producer
 John Hudson – engineer
 Jonathon Miller – engineer
 Simon Fowler – photography
 Nikki Morgan – makeup
 Nicolas Marchant – art direction
 Stylorouge – design

References

External links
 

1984 albums
Gary Glitter albums
Arista Records albums